The 1967 Thailand National Games, officially known as the I Thailand National Games, and commonly known as Phra Nakhon 1967, was a multi-sport event held in Bangkok (Phra Nakhon), Thailand, from 1 to 5 November 1967 with 103 events in 15 sports and disciplines featured in the games . This was Bangkok's first time to host the Thailand National Games. A total of 716 athletes from 5 regions participated in the games.

The final medal tally was led by host Region 4, followed by Region 1 and Region 3.

Organisation

Host city 

This is the first edition of Thailand National Games. It was the first time the capital city in Thailand, Bangkok or Phra Nakhon held the national sporting event.

Development and preparation 
The Bangkok Thailand National Games Organising Committee, led by Chairman Luang Chattrakarn Kosol, Chairman of the board Praphas Charusathien of the Sports Authority of Thailand and Director Kong Visuttharom Sports Authority of Thailand.

Venues 
 National Stadium – Ceremony, Athletics, Cycling (track) and Football
 Gymnasium 1 – Badminton, Basketball, Judo and Weightlifting
 Kittikachorn Stadium – Boxing
 Mittraphap Road – Cycling (road)
 Silom Club Tennis Court – Lawn tennis
 Hockey Stadium – Rugby football
 Gymnasium 2 – Sepak Takraw and Volleyball
 Huamark Shooting Range – Shooting
 Olympic Swimming Pool – Swimming
 Thammasat University Gymnasium – Table tennis

Marketing

Emblem 
The emblem of 1967 Thailand Regional Games was the emblem of Sports Authority of Thailand or SAT and under the logo by the text

The Games

Opening ceremony 
The opening ceremony was held on Wednesday, 1 November 1967, beginning at 16:00 ICT (UTC+7) at the National Stadium. The ceremony began with Prime minister Thanom Kittikachorn entered the stadium. Later, a parade of athletes from the regions of Thailand with host Bangkok (Phra Nakhon) enters the stadium last. After Sports Authority of Thailand chairman of the board Praphas Charusathien gave their respective speech. After Thanom Kittikachorn declared the games opened, Preeda Chullamondhol was lit the cauldron. Later Sutthi Manyakas took an oath. The ceremony ended with the men's football competitions between Region 3 and Region 2.

Closing ceremony 
The opening ceremony was held on Sunday, 1 November 1967, beginning at 17:00 ICT (UTC+7) at the National Stadium. The ceremony began with Prime minister Thanom Kittikachorn entered the stadium. Later, the men's football gold medal match. After the victory ceremony, Thanom Kittikachorn declared the games closed. The ceremony ended with the cauldron extinguished.

Participating regions 
An estimated total of 716 athletes from 5 regions competed at the 1967 Thailand Regional Games.
Region 1 (Northern)

Region 2 (Northeastern)

Region 3 (Northern Central)

Region 4 (Southern Central and Eastern)

Region 5 (Southern)

Sports 
The 1967 Games programme featured 103 events in the following 15 sports:

Withdrawn events

Calendar

Medal table 
A total of 298 medals comprising 103 gold medals, 105 silver medals and 90 bronze medals were awarded to athletes. The host Region 4's performance were placed top on the medal table.

See also 
Other Thailand National Games celebrated in Bangkok
 1977 Thailand National Games
 2000 Thailand National Games

References

External links 
 1967 Thailand National Games report book

Thailand National Games